Fredlanella cerussata is a species of beetle in the family Cerambycidae. It was described by Lane in 1964.

References

Anisocerini
Beetles described in 1964